Tadhg Murphy (born 2 November 1956) is an Irish former hurler and Gaelic footballer. At club level he played with Glanmire, Sarsfields and Imokilly and was a member of the Cork senior teams as a dual player. Murphy is best remembered for scoring a last-minute goal to deny Kerry a record ninth successive title in the 1983 Munster final.

Early life

Born and raised in Glanmire, County Cork, Murphy first played as a schoolboy in various juvenile competitions before later lining out as a student at St Finbarr's College in Cork. He was a member of the St. Finbarr's team  that won three successive Harty Cup titles from 1972 to 1974. Murphy also won All-Ireland titles with the college in 1972 and as team captain in 1974.

Club career

Murphy's club career began as a 9-year-old member of the Glanmire-Sarsfields under-14 teams. He won county titles in this grade in both hurling and football in 1968. His other underage honours include a Cork U21HC title in 1975. By this stage Murphy had joined the respective clubs' top adult teams, making his debut with the Glanmire intermediate football team in 1973 and lining out with Sarsfields for the first time in 1974.

Murphy's performances at club level with Glanmire earned his inclusion on the Imokilly divisional team and he was at left corner-forward when St. Finbarr's were beaten in the 1984 final. He claimed a second winners' medal when St. Finbarr's were again beaten in the 1986 final. Murphy was denied a third winners' medal when Nemo Rangers beat Imokilly in the 1987 final, however, he had earlier claimed a Cork IFC title when Glanmire beat Fermoy.

The second half of Murphy's club career was dominated by hurling matters. He scored nine points when Sarsfields were beaten by Glen Rovers in the 1989 final, however, he ended the championship as top scorer with 3-27. Murphy was 40-years-old and lined out in goal when Sarsfields were beaten by Imokilly in the 1997 final. After leaving the senior ranks and joining the Sarsfields junior team, he ended his club career by winning an East Cork JHL medal in 2001.

Inter-county career

Murphy began his inter-county career as a dual player when he was selected for both the Cork minor hurling and football teams in 1973. He won a Munster MFC medal that season before claiming both provincial titles in 1974. He ended that season with two All-Ireland medals as Cork completed the double following defeats of Kilkenny and Mayo in the respective finals. Murphy's three seasons with the Cork under-21 hurling team was bookended by All-Ireland final defeats in 1975 and 1977, however, he claimed a winners' medal as team captain in 1976. 

By that stage Murphy had already been drafted onto the Cork senior football team and was an unused substitute in their defeat by Kerry in the 1976 Munster final. He switched codes to join the Cork senior hurling team a year later and made his only championship appearance when he came on as a substitute for Gerald McCarthy in the 1977 All-Ireland final defeat of Wexford.

Murphy subsequently committed solely to the Cork senior footballers and was off and on the team over the next few years, including further Munster final defeats by Kerry in 1979 and 1982. He scored a last-minute goal to deny Kerry a record ninth successive title in the 1983 Munster final. Murphy's last game for Cork was a defeat by Kerry in the 1984 Munster final.

Management career

Murphy was heavily involved as a coach in all level with Sarsfields. He was player-manager when the club was beaten by Imokilly in the 1997 final. He later coached the club's under-14 team to their very first Féile na nGael title in 2000. Outside of his own club, Murphy managed  Ardmore to successive titles by winning the Waterford JHC in 2001 and the Waterford IHC title in 2002.

Personal life

Murphy's father, Bertie, was a long-serving player and administrator at club level who eventually became president of the Sarsfields club. His brother, Bertie Óg Murphy, was a two-time All-Ireland medal-winner with the Cork senior hurling team. Murphy's son, Tadhg Óg Murphy, also lined out with Cork.

Honours

Player

St. Finbarr's College
Croke Cup: 1972, 1974 (c)
Harty Cup: 1972, 1973, 1974 (c)

Glanmire
Cork Intermediate Football Championship: 1987

Sarsfields
Cork Under-21 Hurling Championship: 1975

Imokilly
Cork Senior Football Championship: 1984, 1986 

Cork
All-Ireland Senior Hurling Championship: 1977
Munster Senior Hurling Championship: 1977
Munster Senior Football Championship: 1983
All-Ireland Junior Football Championship: 1987
Munster Junior Football Championship: 1986, 1987
All-Ireland Under-21 Hurling Championship: 1976 (c)
Munster Under-21 Hurling Championship: 1975, 1976 (c), 1977
All-Ireland Minor Football Championship: 1974
All-Ireland Minor Hurling Championship: 1974
Munster Minor Hurling Championship: 1974
Munster Minor Football Championship: 1973, 1974

Manager

Sarsfields
Féile na nGael: 2000

Ardmore
Waterford Intermediate Hurling Championship: 2002
Waterford Junior Hurling Championship: 2001

References

1956 births
Living people
Dual players
Sarsfields (Cork) hurlers
Glanmire Gaelic footballers
Imokilly Gaelic footballers
Cork inter-county hurlers
Cork inter-county Gaelic footballers
All-Ireland Senior Hurling Championship winners